Surimi is a Limited European version of the single collection 'Sushi' containing new remixes of Skin and a bonus CD with previously unreleased demos from Neuroticfish.

Track listing
"Skin (Binary 2002)" - 5:59
"Skin (Broken Boyband)" - 5:24
"Skin (Live)" - 5:18
"M.F.A.P.L. (Intelligent Tribal Freak Mix)" - 5:21
"All I Say" - 4:51
"Black Again V3" - 2:29
"Velocity (Original)" - 5:00
"Velocity (Club Edit)" - 5:31
"Neurocaine" - 4:36
"Wakemeup! (Club Edit)" - 5:12
"Wakemeup! (JAB Remix)" - 4:54
"Care" - 6:08
"Rotten" - 4:10
"Wakemeup! (Extended)" - 9:38
"I Don't Care" - 4:56
"Black Again" - 4:54
"Mechanic Of The Sequence" - 4:13
"Love And Hunting" - 4:16

2003 compilation albums
Neuroticfish albums